Alto Larán District is one of eleven districts of the province Chincha in Peru.

References

1965 establishments in Peru
States and territories established in 1965